Colvin Run Mill is in Great Falls, Virginia. Built c. 1811, Colvin Run Mill is the sole
surviving operational 19th-century water-powered mill in the Washington, D.C. metropolitan area, and its restored mechanism is a nationally significant example of automated technologies pioneered in milling and later adopted across American industry.
Down the gravel path of the park is the miller's house, home to the families who ran the mill. In 1883, Addison Millard moved his family here when he bought the old mill. Addison, his wife Emma, and some of their 20 children lived there. When Addison died, the family stayed and operated the mill until 1934.

In the mid-1930s the mill was abandoned, and highway development caused it to be cut off from any near-by water source. The mill was later acquired by the Fairfax County Park Authority, repaired, and made open to the public.

Civil War era
The Battle of Dranesville was a small battle during the American Civil War that took place between Confederate forces under Brigadier General J. E. B. Stuart and Union forces under Brigadier General Edward O. C. Ord on December 20, 1861, in Fairfax County, Virginia, as part of Major General George B. McClellan's operations in northern Virginia.  The two forces on similar winter-time patrols encountered and engaged one another in the crossroads village of Dranesville.

Ord, leading the 10,000 strong 3rd Brigade of Pennsylvania Reserves set out west from Langley to clear the south bank of the Potomac River of Confederate pickets and partisans in Fairfax and Loudoun. At Colvin Run Mill, Ord left half his force to protect his rear and prevent his force from being cut off from their base at Langley. The battle resulted in a Union victory.

References

External links

 Official website
 Colvin Run Mill, 10017 Colvin Run Road, Great Falls, Fairfax County, VA: 2 photos at Historic American Buildings Survey
  Colvin Run Mill Park and Village
 Colvin Run Mill YouTube video. Retrieved September 07, 2009

National Register of Historic Places in Fairfax County, Virginia
Industrial buildings completed in 1811
Virginia municipal and county parks
Museums in Fairfax County, Virginia
Grinding mills on the National Register of Historic Places in Virginia
Mill museums in Virginia
Parks in Fairfax County, Virginia
Watermills in the United States
Textile mills in the United States